Dilman may refer to:

Geography
Dilman, Azerbaijan, village and municipality in the Agsu Rayon of Azerbaijan
Former name of Salmas, Iran
Location of Battle of Dilman, 1915
Deylaman, Iran

People

Surname
Artur Dilman (born 1990), Kazakh swimmer
Daniil Dilman (born 1996), Russian snowboarder
Viktor Dilman (born 1926), Russian scientist
Vladimir Dilman (1925–1994), Soviet scientist and physician

Given name
Dilman Dila, Ugandan writer
Dilman Kinsey Erb, Canadian educator, farmer, and politician